Martin is an unincorporated community in Fayette County, Pennsylvania, United States. Martin has a post office, with ZIP code 15460.

References

Unincorporated communities in Fayette County, Pennsylvania
Unincorporated communities in Pennsylvania